Hayden High School may refer to one of the following:

Hayden High School (Alabama) in Hayden, Alabama
Hayden High School (Arizona) in Hayden-Winkelman, Arizona
Hayden High School (Colorado) in Hayden, Colorado
Hayden High School (Topeka, Kansas) in Topeka, Kansas
Hayden High School (Franklin, Virginia), listed on the National Register of Historic Places